Pyynikki is a district and a nature reserve in Tampere, Finland. It is located in the Pyynikinharju ridge,  between the city center and the western district of Pispala. Pyynikinharju is the highest esker in the world, rising 85 meters above the level of lake Pyhäjärvi.

Tampere Circuit was a motorsport race track which ran on public streets of Pyynikki. In 1962 and 1963, the Finnish motorcycle Grand Prix on Tampere Circuit was a race of the Road Racing World Championship.

Notable sights 
Pyynikki Esker
Pyynikki observation tower
Pyynikki Summer Theatre
Viikinsaari Island

References 

 
Parks in Tampere